Gemma Sanderson (born 10 July 1983) is an Australian model, best known for winning the first cycle of the reality television show Australia's Next Top Model.

Early career
Prior to winning in Australia's Next Top Model, Sanderson was a finalist in Dolly Magazine'''s annual model search, which fellow Australian model Miranda Kerr had won the previous year.

Australia's Next Top Model
Sanderson was criticized during the final weeks of the show in regard to her suffering from depression, which she admitted to during episode 5. Sanderson won a number of challenges, showing early favoritism from judge Marguerite Kramer (former Harper's Bazaar editor). Sanderson won the show and went on to model both in Australia and internationally, having been represented by Next Model Management in New York, Chic Management in Sydney, Beatrice Models in Milan, and Storm Models in London.

Career
Internationally, she has shot for Macy's, Tchibo, Auchan, and the ASOS catalogue.  She portrays the angel girlfriend in Lynx and Axe advertisements.

In Australia and New Zealand, her advertising and fashion campaigns include Jeans West, David Jones Limited, and Myer, while she has appeared in magazines like Dolly Magazine, Frankie Magazine, Cleo, Marie Claire, and FHM.  Internationally, she has appeared on the covers of Escape Magazine (Hong Kong) and Silhouette (Italy), and in Elle, Maxim, Jack Magazine, and Grazia'' (UK).

Sanderson has walked in Australian Fashion Weeks, for leading Australian and New Zealand designers Lisa Ho, Alannah Hill, Trelise Cooper, David Jones Limited, and Myer.

References

External links
 

1983 births
Living people
People from Newcastle, New South Wales
Australian female models
Australia's Next Top Model winners